Jacob Elias la Fargue (1735 – 1778), was an 18th-century painter from the Northern Netherlands.

Biography
He was born in Voorburg to Jan Thomas la Fargue and was the younger brother of Paulus Constantijn la Fargue.  His other siblings Maria Margaretha, Karel and Isaac Lodewijk also became painters.	
He became a member of the Confrerie Pictura in The Hague in 1761 and lived and worked there until he died.

References

	
Jacob Elias la Fargue on Artnet	
	

1735 births
1778 deaths
18th-century Dutch painters
18th-century Dutch male artists
Dutch male painters
People from Voorburg
Painters from The Hague